
Gmina Korsze is an urban-rural gmina (administrative district) in Kętrzyn County, Warmian-Masurian Voivodeship, in northern Poland.

Villages
Apart from the town of Korsze, Gmina Korsze contains the villages and settlements of Babieniec, Błogoszewo, Błuskajmy Małe, Błuskajmy Wielkie, Bykowo, Chmielnik, Długi Lasek, Dłużec Mały, Dłużec Wielki, Dubliny, Dzierżążnik, Dzikowizna, Garbno, Giełpsz, Głowbity, Gnojewo, Góra, Gudniki, Gudziki, Kałmy, Kałwągi, Kamień, Karszewo, Kaskajmy Małe, Kowalewo Duże, Kowalewo Małe, Kraskowo, Krzemity, Łankiejmy, Łękajny, Marłuty, Nunkajmy, Olszynka, Parys, Piaskowiec, Płutniki, Podgórzyn, Podlechy, Polany, Pomnik, Prosna, Równica Dolna, Równica Górna, Saduny, Sajna Mała, Sajna Wielka, Sarkajmy, Sątoczek, Sątoczno, Słępy, Starynia, Stawnica, Studzieniec, Suliki, Suśnik, Tołkiny, Trzeciaki, Wągniki, Wandajny, Warnikajmy, Wetyn, Wiklewko, Wiklewo and Wygoda.

Neighbouring gminas
Gmina Korsze is bordered by the gminas of Barciany, Bisztynek, Kętrzyn, Reszel and Sępopol.

References
 Polish official population figures 2006

Korsze
Kętrzyn County

de:Korsze#Gemeinde